Mario Buckup (born 11 November 1947) is a Brazilian sailor. He competed in the Tempest event at the 1972 Summer Olympics.

References

External links
 

1947 births
Living people
Brazilian male sailors (sport)
Olympic sailors of Brazil
Sailors at the 1972 Summer Olympics – Tempest
Sportspeople from São Paulo